Streptomyces olivochromogenes is a bacterium species from the genus of Streptomyces which has been isolated from soil. Streptomyces olivochromogenes produces ferulic acid. The xylose isomerase from Streptomyces olivochromogenes is used in the food industry.

Further reading

See also 
 List of Streptomyces species

References

External links
Type strain of Streptomyces olivochromogenes at BacDive -  the Bacterial Diversity Metadatabase	

olivochromogenes
Bacteria described in 1948